Finn Creek Provincial Park is a provincial park in British Columbia, Canada, north of Avola and Blue River in the valley of the North Thompson River.

References

Provincial parks of British Columbia
Thompson Country
1996 establishments in British Columbia
Protected areas established in 1996